The Chinde River is a distributary of the Zambezi river delta in Mozambique. The town of Chinde is located on its banks.

References

External links 
 Map showing the Chinde River

Rivers of Mozambique
Tributaries of the Zambezi River
Mozambique Channel